Euphiusa is a monotypic genus of moths in the family Erebidae. Its sole species is Euphiusa harmonica (Hampson, 1902).

References
Natural History Museum Lepidoptera genus database

Ophiusini
Monotypic moth genera